Liga ASOBAL 2002–03 season was the 13th since its establishment. A total of 16 teams competed this season for the championship.

Competition format
This season, the competition was played in a round-robin format, through 30 rounds. The team with most points earned wins the championship. The last two teams were relegated.

Overall standing
Final standing is

Squads 
See.

Top goal scorers
Bilal Šuman from Barakaldo UPV is top scorer with 196 goals.

References 

2002
Spain
Liga Ascobal